Lewis Humphrey Pounds (April 9, 1860 in Eaton, Lorain County, Ohio – December 16, 1947 in Brooklyn, New York) was an American businessman and politician.

Life
He graduated from Oberlin College and Boston University. About 1893 he moved to Brooklyn, New York where he became a real estate broker and developer. He married Carrie Stilson (d. 1940).

He was Brooklyn Commissioner of Public Works when he was elected Borough President of Brooklyn on July 3, 1913. He stayed in office until 1917, the only Republican Borough President of Brooklyn in history. On April 30, 1921, he was appointed one of the original six commissioners of the Port of New York Authority, and later became its president.

He was the last New York State Treasurer, elected in 1924 defeating the incumbent Democrat George K. Shuler. Governor Al Smith undertook a major re-organisation of the State government during his four terms in office, and the State Treasury was merged on January 1, 1927, into the Department of Audit and Control headed by the New York State Comptroller.

In 1932, after the resignation of Jimmy Walker, Pounds ran for Mayor of New York City, but was defeated by Democrat John P. O'Brien.

He was a delegate to the 1908, 1936 and 1940 Republican National Conventions.

He died at his home at 317, East Seventeenth Street, in Brooklyn, and was buried at the Northport Rural Cemetery in Northport, New York.

Sources
 Political Graveyard
Elected Borough Pres., in NYT on July 4, 1913
 Appointed port commissioner, in NYT on May 1, 1921
Pres of Port Authority, in NYT on June 17, 1922

1860 births
1947 deaths
New York State Treasurers
People from Lorain County, Ohio
Brooklyn borough presidents
Oberlin College alumni
Boston University alumni
New York (state) Republicans
Burials in New York (state)